Ascanio Sobrero (12 October 1812 – 26 May 1888) was an Italian chemist, born in Casale Monferrato. He was studying under Théophile-Jules Pelouze at the University of Turin, who had worked with the explosive material guncotton.

He studied medicine in Turin and Paris and then chemistry at the University of Gießen with Justus Liebig, and earned his doctorate in 1832. In 1845 he became professor at the University of Turin

During his research he discovered, in 1847, nitroglycerine. He initially called it "pyroglycerine", and warned vigorously against its use in his private letters and in a journal article, stating that it was extremely dangerous and impossible to handle.  In fact, he was so frightened by what he created that he kept it a secret for over a year.

Another of Pelouze's students was the young Alfred Nobel, who returned to the Nobel family's defunct armaments factory and began experimenting with the material around 1860; it did, indeed prove to be very difficult to discover how to handle it safely. In the 1860s Nobel received several patents around the world for mixtures, devices and manufacturing methods based on the explosive power of nitroglycerine, eventually leading to the invention of dynamite, ballistite and gelignite from which he made a fortune.

Although Nobel always acknowledged and honored Sobrero as the man who had discovered nitroglycerine, Sobrero was dismayed by the uses to which the explosive had been put and claimed he was almost ashamed by his discovery.

Works

References

 

Italian chemists
1812 births
1888 deaths
University of Paris alumni
University of Turin alumni
University of Giessen alumni
Academic staff of the University of Turin
People from Casale Monferrato
19th-century Italian inventors
Scientists from Turin
19th-century Italian chemists